Bojong Gede Station (BJD) is a railway station located in Bojong Gede, Bojong Gede, Bogor Regency, West Java that was opened in 1873. The station is located at an altitude of +140 meters above sea level. This station serves as a KRL Commuterline train stop serving the Jabodetabek area.

On 19 April 2022, the Ministry of Transportation carry out the physical work of the skybridge construction project after signing the work contract for the construction of the overpass that connects this station with the Bojong Gede type C bus terminal which is located 400 meters northwest of this station.

Station layout 
This station has two railway tracks. In 2015, the station platform was extended to accomodate 12 carriages of a single KRL train series.

Services
The following is a list of train services at the Bojong Gede Station

Passenger services 
 KAI Commuter

Intermodal support

Incidents 

 On 21 November 2012, landslides caused the railway line to be cut between Bojong Gede Station and Cilebut Station. Bojon Gede Station automatically becomes the last station for KRL trips to Bogor. The rail track that was hit by the landslide was successfully repaired within 8 days.

References

External links

Bogor Regency
Railway stations in West Java
Railway stations opened in 1873